"Body" is a song by British rappers Russ Millions and Tion Wayne, released on 25 March 2021 through GDS Records and Atlantic Records. The song was produced by Gotcha, and promoted with a TikTok dance challenge, as well as a remix released in April 2021 featuring Bugzy Malone, Fivio Foreign, Darkoo, Buni, ArrDee, E1 (3x3) and ZT (3x3). "Body" peaked at the top of the UK Singles Chart, becoming the first UK drill song to top the chart. Outside the United Kingdom, "Body" topped the charts in Australia, Ireland and New Zealand, and peaked within the top ten of the charts in Austria, Czech Republic, Denmark, Greece, the Netherlands, Norway, Sweden and Switzerland. The song also reached the top 20 in Canada, Finland, Iceland, Lithuania, Portugal, Singapore and Slovakia.

Background
Russ Millions and Tion Wayne previously collaborated on the 2019 single "Keisha & Becky", which peaked at number seven on the UK Singles Chart. "Body" was described as a boast about wealth "over rapid, clattering beats" in the Evening Standard.

Critical reception
The track was named one of the "14 Songs that Give Us Hope for the Future" by the staff of Vice magazine, with writer Ryan Bassil commenting that another collaboration between the pair was "always going to be good" after "Keisha & Becky".

Track listing
Digital download
"Body" – 3:03

Digital download
"Body" (remix) (featuring ArrDee, E1 (3x3), ZT (3x3), Bugzy Malone, Buni, Fivio Foreign and Darkoo) – 4:38

Digital download
"Body" (remix) (featuring  and Rondodasosa) – 3:25

Digital download
"Body" (remix) (featuring Ricky Rich) – 3:17

Digital download
"Body" (remix) (featuring Murda) – 3:03

Digital download
"Body" (remix) (featuring Jack Harlow) – 2:48

Charts

Weekly charts

Year-end charts

Certifications

References

2021 songs
2021 singles
Russ Millions songs
Tion Wayne songs
Atlantic Records singles
Irish Singles Chart number-one singles
Number-one singles in Australia
Number-one singles in New Zealand
Songs written by Russ Millions
Songs written by Tion Wayne
UK Singles Chart number-one singles
UK drill songs